Edward or Ed Hoffman may refer to:

 Edward J. Hoffman (1942–2004), American inventor
 Tex Hoffman (Edward Adolph Hoffman, 1893–1947), Major League Baseball 3rd baseman
 Edward George Hoffman (1877–1931), Democratic National Committee member from Indiana
 Edward L. Hoffman, United States Army Air Service pilot who helped develop the parachute
 Ed Hoffman (died 2014), American football coach

See also 
 Ede Reményi (Eduard Hoffmann, 1828–1898), Hungarian violinist